Costa Rica has possessed multiple and very varied constitutional bodies.

The Constitutional Assemblies of Costa Rica have been, in almost all cases, convened after a coup d'état or armed conflict, since it is the custom in Costa Rica that when a government is deposed, an Assembly will be convened to draft a new constitutional body that legitimizes the new regime. This was true from the first Constituent Congress of the State of Costa Rica convened shortly after the independence of Central America until the most recent National Constituent Assembly of 1949, which occurred after the Civil War of 1948.

References

Constitutions of Costa Rica
Constitutional history